Theudigisel (or Theudegisel) (in Latin Theudigisclus and in Spanish, Galician and Portuguese Teudiselo, Teudigiselo, or Teudisclo), ( 500 – December 549) was king of the Visigoths in Hispania and Septimania (548–549). Some Visigothic king lists skip Theudigisel, as well as Agila I, going directly from Theudis to Athanagild.

Biography
Theudigisel was a leading Ostrogoth general of Theudis, and, when the latter was murdered, managed to make himself king. He had repelled the Franks from Spain after their invasion of 541, cutting them off in the pass of Valcarlos, but accepted a bribe to allow them to return to home.

According to Isidore of Seville, Theudigisel was assassinated because he "defiled the marriages of very many powerful men by public prostitution", and was assassinated by a group of conspirators during a banquet in Seville. Although he agrees that Theudigisel died during a banquet, Gregory of Tours records a different tale of his end: in the middle of the feast, the lights were blown out and an unidentified person killed Theudigisel in the dark. "The Goths had adopted the reprehensible habit of killing out of hand any king who displeased them and replacing him on the throne by someone they preferred," Gregory concludes.

References 

549 deaths
Assassinated Gothic people
6th-century murdered monarchs
6th-century Visigothic monarchs
Year of birth unknown